Gammarotettix is a North American genus of camel crickets in the family Rhaphidophoridae. They are also called chaparral camel crickets or arboreal camel crickets and are between 10-18 mm. They live mainly in California and possibly in southern Oregon and Arizona.

There are about six described species in Gammarotettix.

Species
These six species belong to the genus Gammarotettix:
 Gammarotettix aesculus Strohecker, 1951
 Gammarotettix apache Rehn, 1940
 Gammarotettix bilobatus (Thomas, 1872)
 Gammarotettix bovis Rehn, 1941
 Gammarotettix cyclocercus Hebard, 1916
 Gammarotettix genitalis Caudell, 1916

References

Further reading

 

Rhaphidophoridae
Articles created by Qbugbot